Ekspress-AM2 (meaning Express-AM2) is a Russian domestic communications satellite. It belongs to the Russian Satellite Communications Company (RSCC) based in Moscow, Russia. To provide of communications services (digital television, telephony, videoconferencing, data transmission, the Internet access) and to deploy satellite networks by applying VSAT technology to Russia and its neighbors (CIS).

Satellite description 
The satellite has a total of 29 transponders, was 16 C-band, 12 Ku-band and 1 L-band transponders. The Ekspress-AM2 Russian domestic communications satellite, built by Information Satellite Systems Reshetnev (NPO PM) for Kosmicheskaya Svyaz. The communications payload was built by the French company Alcatel Space.

Launch 
Ekspress-AM2 was launched by Khrunichev State Research and Production Space Center, using a Proton-K / DM-2M launch vehicle. The launch took place at 21:31:00 UTC on 29 March 2005, from Site 200/39 at Baikonur Cosmodrome, Kazakhstan. Successfully deployed into geostationary transfer orbit (GTO), Ekspress-AM2 raised itself into an operational geostationary orbit using its apogee motor.

Mission 
Ekspress-AM2 was retired in 2016 and was moved into a graveyard orbit above the geostationary belt.

References 

Ekspress satellites
Spacecraft launched in 2005
2005 in Russia
Satellites using the KAUR bus